Vietnam Veterans Memorial Bridge carries the Pocahontas Parkway, signed as State Route 895, across the James River between the independent city of Richmond and Henrico County. Crossing the southernmost extremity of Richmond, it provides a connection between Henrico and the southern end of Chippenham Parkway near U.S. Route 1 in Chesterfield County, Virginia.

It is the tallest bridge in the Richmond Metropolitan Area. It is also the most expensive toll bridge in the area.

Bridge features
The high-level bridge cost $111 million.

Public-private partnership
The bridge and the accompanying  Pocahontas Parkway are toll facilities. They were built through a public-private partnership. Though the road had been planned for many years, sufficient state and federal construction funds were not available when the road was finally desired.

In 1995, the Virginia General Assembly passed the Public-Private Transportation Act allowing private entities to propose solutions for designing, constructing, financing and operating transportation improvements. A proposal for the Pocahontas Parkway and the Vietnam Veterans Memorial Bridge was submitted jointly by Fluor Daniel and Morrison-Knudsen, and an agreement was reached. At the end of the designated period, under the agreement, the ownership of both the bridge and the parkway will be turned over to the Commonwealth of Virginia.

See also

 Pocahontas Parkway

References

External links
Virginia Highways Project: VA 895
Roads to the Future: Route 895 - Pocahontas Parkway

Bridges over the James River (Virginia)
Transportation in Henrico County, Virginia
Bridges completed in 2002
Bridges in Richmond, Virginia
Buildings and structures in Henrico County, Virginia
Monuments and memorials in Virginia
Vietnam War monuments and memorials in the United States
Road bridges in Virginia
2002 establishments in Virginia
Toll bridges in Virginia